Juben (also Romanized as Jūben, Jooban, Jowbon, Jūban, and Jūbon; also known as Dzhuban and Jūbīn) is a village in Rostamabad-e Jonubi Rural District, in the Central District of Rudbar County, Gilan Province, Iran. At the 2006 census, its population was 1,673, in 490 families.

References 

Populated places in Rudbar County